James Clifton Haislip (August 4, 1891 – January 26, 1970) was a Major League Baseball pitcher.

External links

Philadelphia Phillies players
1891 births
1970 deaths
Baseball players from Texas
Bonham Boosters players

Dallas Katydids players
Waco Navigators players
Denison Blue Sox players
Dallas Giants players
Denison Champions players
Fort Smith Twins players
Denison Railroaders players
Sherman Browns players
People from Farmersville, Texas